Pelican Brewing Company is a brewery based in the U.S. state of Oregon. The company was established in Pacific City in 1996. There are also locations in Cannon Beach and Tillamook.

The company was recognized by the Australian International Beer Awards and the Oregon Beer Awards in 2021.

Beers
Pelican offers a wide variety of both seasonal and year-round beers, including:

Year-round
 Kiwanda, Pre-Prohibition Cream Ale
 Raspberried at Sea, Ale with Raspberries
 Sea 'N Red, Irish-Style Red Ale
 Cape Crasher, PNW India Pale Ale
 Beak Breaker, Double India Pale Ale
 Tsunami, Export Stout
 Head Out, American Wheat beer
 Planet Nectaron, Nectaron Hop IPA
 Pelican Pilsner, Pilsner
 Paddleback, Oceanic Pale Ale
 Updrift, India Pale Ale
 Hazy Rock, Juicy India Pale Ale
 Hazestack, Double Hazy India Pale Ale
 Superswell, Double Pilsner

Seasonal
 Dark Hearted Blonde, Coffee Blonde Stout
 Wingwave, Dry-Hopped Lager
 Bronze God, Marzen-Style Lager
 Bad Santa, Cascadian Dark Ale
 Seahops, India Pale Ale
 Dune Climber, West Coast Hazy IPA
 Slide Tackle, Hazy India Pale Ale

Lone Pelican Series
 Volume I, Alder Smoked Stout
 Volume II, Triple Cold India Pale Ale
 Volume III, Summer India Pale Ale

Barrel-Aged Collection
 Siren of the Sea, Amber Ale
 South of the Breaker, Double India Pale Ale
 Captain of the Coast, Wee Heavy Ale
 Mother of all Storms, English-style Barleywine

Non-Alcoholic Drinks
On June 16th, 2022, Pelican Brewing launched its first non-alcoholic beverage in the form of Sparkle Hops--a hop-infused sparkling water beverage. The drink comes in two flavors: strata hops with açai and citra hops with lemon. The idea originated within Pelican's staff as a drink for brewers to drink while they were working on the brew deck.

See also

 Brewing in Oregon

References

External links
 
 

1996 establishments in Oregon
American companies established in 1996
Beer brewing companies based in Oregon
Restaurants in Oregon